The mass of the Earth is estimated as approximately . Weight of the World may refer to:

Television 
 "The Weight of the World" (Buffy the Vampire Slayer), from the fifth season of the series Buffy the Vampire Slayer
 "Weight of the World" (The 4400), from the second season of the series The 4400

Music

Albums

 The Weight of the World (The Beautiful Girls album), 2004
 Weight of the World (Harem Scarem album), 2002
 The Weight of the World (Metal Church album), 2004
 Weight of the World (This Is Hell album), 2010
 Weight of the World, a 2006 album and song by The Jimmy Swift Band
 Weight of the World, a 2020 album by Mike

Songs
 "Weight of the World"  (Elton John song), 2004
 "Weight of the World" (Evanescence song), 2006
 "Weight of the World" (Lemar song), 2008
 "Weight of the World" (Ringo Starr song), 1992
 "Weight of the World" (Smilo song), 2016
 "Weight of the World" (Young Guns song), 2010
 "Weight of the World", by Black Rebel Motorcycle Club from Howl, 2005
 "Weight of the World", by Blue October from Approaching Normal, 2009
 "Weight of the World", by Chantal Kreviazuk from What If It All Means Something, 2002
 "Weight of the World", by Converge from No Heroes, 2006
 "Weight of the World", by Crown the Empire from Retrograde, 2016
 "The Weight of the World", by Editors from An End Has a Start, 2007
 "Weight of the World", by Erasure from The Innocents, 1988
 "Weight of the World", by Framing Hanley from A Promise to Burn, 2010
 "The Weight of the World", by Joe Satriani from Unstoppable Momentum, 2013
 "Weight of the World", by Keiichi Okabe from Nier: Automata Original Soundtrack, 2017
 "Weight of the World", by Misery Signals from Controller, 2008
 "Weight of the World", by Neil Young from Landing on Water, 1986
 "Weight of the World", by Overkill from I Hear Black, 1993
 "Weight of the World", by Pigeon John from And the Summertime Pool Party, 2006
 "Weight of the World", by Saliva Back into Your System, 2002
 "Weight of the World", by The Samples from Autopilot, 1994
 "Weight of the World", by Shadows Fall from Fire from the Sky, 2012
 "Weight of the World", by Tarkio from Sea Songs for Landlocked Sailors, 1999
 "Weight of the World", by Throwdown from Venom & Tears, 2007
 "Weight of the World", by Widespread Panic from Widespread Panic, 1991

Literature 
 The Weight of the World, a book by Peter Handke

See also 
 Earth mass